Foghat Live is a 1977 live album by Foghat. The release is Foghat's bestselling album with over two million copies sold, and certified double platinum in the United States.

In 2007, to celebrate the 30th anniversary of the album, Foghat released the Live II double album.

Track listing

Side one
 "Fool for the City" (Dave Peverett) - 5:31
 "Home in My Hand" (Dave Peverett, Rod Price) - 4:56
 "I Just Want to Make Love to You" (Willie Dixon) - 8:36

Side two
 "Road Fever" (Peverett, Price) - 5:29
 "Honey Hush" (Big Joe Turner) - 5:38
 "Slow Ride" (Peverett) - 8:21

Personnel 
Adapted from album liner notes

Foghat
"Lonesome" Dave Peverett – Rhythm Guitar and Lead Vocals.
Rod Price – Lead Guitar and Backing Vocals.
Craig MacGregor – Bass and Backing Vocals.
Roger Earl – Drums.

Other Musicians
Dan Craig - Percussion.
Dave Lang - Percussion.
Nick Jameson - Percussion.

Recording Unit
Nick Jameson – Engineer and Producer.
Bill Inglot – Remastering.
Ken Perry – Remastering.
Alen MacWeeney – Photography.
Tony Outeda – Coordination.

Charts

Certifications

References 

Foghat albums
1977 live albums
Bearsville Records live albums